Eriogonum contiguum is an uncommon species of wild buckwheat. It is commonly known as Reveal's buckwheat and annual desert trumpet. It is native to Death Valley in California and adjacent sections of Nevada. It is commonly found in Death Valley National Park and Mojave National Preserve. Eriogonum contiguum grows in sandy to gravelly flats and slopes, or rocky hills, and lower bajadas with Atriplex species. It is an annual herb which produces an erect, spreading stem up to about 30 centimeters high. Leaves are basal, small rounded, and woolly. The many scattered inflorescences are small, compact clusters of tiny hairy yellow flowers. Flowers bloom April to June. It is threatened due to habitat degradation by off road vehicles, competition with exotic plant species, trampling, grazing, and erosion.

References

External links
Jepson Manual Treatment
Photo gallery

contiguum
Flora of California
Flora of Nevada